John Harold (9 November 1873 – 16 February 1947) was a Liberal party and Unionist member of the House of Commons of Canada. He was born in Brantford, Ontario and became a manufacturer.

He was elected to Parliament at the Brant riding in the 1917 general election. After serving one federal term, the 13th Canadian Parliament, Harold left the House of Commons and did not seek re-election in the 1921 general vote. He made one attempt to return to Parliament when he was a Liberal candidate for Brant in the 1930 federal election but lost to Franklin Smoke, the incumbent at that time.

He died at his home in Paris, Ontario on 16 February 1947.

Electoral record

References

External links
 

1873 births
1947 deaths
Members of the House of Commons of Canada from Ontario
Politicians from Brantford
Unionist Party (Canada) MPs